G protein-coupled receptor 55 also known as GPR55 is a G protein-coupled receptor that in humans is encoded by the GPR55 gene.

GPR55, along with GPR119 and GPR18, have been implicated as novel cannabinoid receptors.

History 

GPR55 was identified and cloned for the first time in 1999. Later it was identified by an in silico screen as a putative cannabinoid receptor because of a similar amino acid sequence in the binding region. Research groups from Glaxo Smith Kline and Astra Zeneca characterized the receptor extensively because it was hoped to be responsible for the blood pressure lowering properties of cannabinoids. GPR55 is indeed activated by endogenous and exogenous cannabinoids such as plant and synthetic cannabinoids but GPR-55 knockout mice generated by a research group from Glaxo Smith Kline showed no altered blood pressure regulation after administration of the cannabidiol-derivative abnormal cannabidiol.

Signal cascade 

GPR55 is coupled to the G-protein G13 and activation of the receptor leads to stimulation of rhoA, cdc42 and rac1.

Pharmacology 

GPR55 is activated by the plant cannabinoids Δ9-THC and the endocannabinoids anandamide, 2-AG and noladin ether in the low nanomolar range. Exocannabinoids such as the synthetic cannabinoid CP-55940 are also able to activate the receptor while the structurally unrelated cannabinoid mimic WIN 55,212-2 fails to activate the receptor. Recent research suggests that lysophosphatidylinositol and its 2-arachidonoyl derivative, 2-arachidonoyl lysophosphatidylinositol (2-ALPI), may be the endogenous ligands for GPR55 and the receptor appears likely to be a possible target for treatment of inflammation and pain as with the other cannabinoid receptors.

This profile as a distinct non-CB1/CB2 receptor which responds to a variety of both endogenous and exogenous cannabinoid ligands has led some groups to suggest GPR55 should be categorised as the CB3 receptor, and this re-classification may follow in time. However this is complicated by the fact that another possible CB3 receptor has been discovered in the hippocampus, although its gene has not yet been cloned, suggesting that there may be at least four cannabinoid receptors which will eventually be characterised.  Evidence accumulated during the last few years suggests that GPR55 plays a relevant role in cancer and opens the possibility of considering this orphan receptor as a new therapeutic target and potential biomarker in oncology.

Ligands
Agonists
Ligands found to bind to GPR55 as agonists include:
 Lysophosphatidylinositol
 2-Arachidonoyl lysophosphatidylinositol
 Abnormal cannabidiol (Abn-CBD)
 AM-251 (also CB1 antagonist)
 CP 55,940
 GSK-319,197
 GSK-494,581 - also glycine transporter 1 inhibitor 
 GSK-522,373
 O-1602
 Δ9-Tetrahydrocannabinol
 Tetrahydrocannabivarin (THCV)  
 2-Arachidonoylglycerol (2-AG)
 Noladin ether
 Oleoylethanolamide 
 Palmitoylethanolamide
 ML-184, ML-185 and ML-186 

Antagonists
 CID-16020046 - inverse agonist at GPR55
 O-1918
 ML-191, ML-192 and ML-193
 PSB-SB-487 and PSB-SB-1203 
 Cannabidiol

Physiological function 

The physiological role of GPR55 is unclear. Mice with a target deletion of the GPR55 gene show no specific phenotype. GPR55 is widely expressed in the brain, especially in the cerebellum. It is expressed in the jejunum and ileum but apparently not more generally in the periphery. Osteoblasts and osteoclasts express GPR55 and this has been shown to regulate bone cell function.

References

Further reading 

 

G protein-coupled receptors